USS Chesapeake (FFG-64) will be the third ship of the  of guided-missile frigates and the sixth ship in the United States Navy bearing this name and will be built by Marinette Marine, a subsidiary of Fincantieri, with an expected completion date of August 2028. She is named in honor of the first USS Chesapeake, one of the original six frigates of the United States Navy. The ship will be sponsored by Barbara Strasser, the wife of Rear Admiral Joseph C. Strasser.

References 

Proposed ships of the United States Navy